The sixgill sharks are a genus, Hexanchus, of deepwater sharks in the family Hexanchidae. These sharks are characterized by a broad, pointed head, six pairs of gill slits, comb-like, yellow lower teeth, and a long tail. The largest species can grow up to 8 m long and weigh over 600 kg (1320 lb). They are continental shelf-dwelling and abyssal plain scavengers with a keen sense of smell and are among the first to arrive at carrion, together with hagfish and rattails. They show a characteristic rolling motion of the head when feeding.

Though only two extant species (the bluntnose sixgill shark and the bigeyed sixgill shark) were originally known, a third, the Atlantic sixgill shark, was found to exist.

Swimming behavior
The bluntnose sixgill shark, Hexanchus griseus, is relatively common to scientists. However, very little information exists about its distribution patterns, migrations and behavior. Data on occurrence and behavior of sixgill sharks inhabiting waters north of Spain (Galicia and Cantabrian Sea, NE Atlantic) were obtained from yearly oceanographic trawl surveys. 
Data obtained from one electronic pop-up tag (Mini PAT), provided information about depth and temperature preferences over 75 days. Mean depth obtained during that period was 913 m (depth range 727–1247 m), and the mean temperature was 10.3 °C, (range 8.0–10.8 °C). Movements up and down in the water column within a single day ranged from 50 to 385 m. No cyclic diel vertical migration was however observed, the shark moved smoothly without a defined pattern.

The six-gill sharks have the ability to alter their feeding behaviors due to the situation that they are in. A feeding behavior analysis displayed that the six-gill sharks are able to utilize a bite of food compared to other aquatic vertebrates.

Extant species
 Hexanchus griseus  {Bonnaterre, 1788) (bluntnose sixgill shark)
 Hexanchus nakamurai Teng, 1962 (bigeyed sixgill shark)
Hexanchus vitulus Springer & Waller, 1969 (Atlantic sixgill shark)

Extinct species

 Hexanchus agassizi  Cappetta, 1976
 Hexanchus andersoni Jordan, 1907
 Hexanchus casieri Kozlov, 1999
 Hexanchus collinsonae Ward, 1979
 Hexanchus gracilis Davis, 1887
 Hexanchus hookeri Ward, 1979
 Hexanchus microdon Agassiz, 1843
 Hexanchus tusbairicus Kozlov in Zhelezko & Kozlov, 1999

See also

Shark teeth
List of prehistoric cartilaginous fish genera

References

External links
 

 

 
Sinemurian genus first appearances
Extant Early Jurassic first appearances
Shark genera
Taxa named by Constantine Samuel Rafinesque